eFounders is a startup studio that designs, builds, and launches startups. It was founded in France and Belgium in 2011 by Thibaud Elziere and Quentin Nickmans. All startup ideas originate with the team, who then present to entrepreneurs and invite them to join eFounders in launching the startup. The firms is dedicated to developing B2B SaaS startups. Since their launch, they have e helped build 27 software startups.

History 
eFounders was founded in 2011 by Thibaud Elziere, founder of Fotolia, and Quentin Nickmans. In 2015, the startup studio raised 6 million euros. A second round of fundraising followed in 2016, with 5 million euros raised from investors. eFounders had created 9 startups by the end of 2016, and had plans to launch another 8 with the funding.

In 2018, six of the firm's startups had raised 100 million euros: Spendesk, Aircall, Forest, Front, Slite, and Station; other startups had joined the Y Combinator program. In April 2018, the startup TextMaster became the firm's' first release when it sold to Technicis. They later sold Hivy to Managed by Q and Mention to NewsDesk. In 2019, theys bought out and replaced existing investors of startup Yousign. This approach was different in that eFounders did not design the company from scratch. Yousign was then treated the same as all its other startups. 

In 2019, eFounders' startups had post-money valuation of $541 million and generated a combined $67 million in annual recurring revenue. By July 2020, the firms had launched 25 companies. Those startups raised $148 million in 2020 and had a total valuation of $1.5 billion. They generated around $10 million in monthly recurring revenue, or double that of 2019.

In 2020, eFounders announced that they would no longer focus solely on Software as a Service (SaaS) startups.

In January 2021, eFounders announced that it was launching a second startup studio that would be headed by Camille Tyan, founder of PayPlug. The new studio, Logic Founders, is specifically for fintech companies and will focus on the B2B market; it plans to launch 8 companies from 2021-2023. The   process will follow the same model as eFounders by recruiting co-founders and working with the fintech startup for the first 12 to 18 months.

Method 
The firm   identifies a market opportunity and then recruit “co-founders,” a CEO and a CTO, to help promote and develop the project. At this point, the firm owns 100% of the business. The startup works with eFounders to hire 10-15 additional team members and build the first version of the product. The team looks for outside investors and the startup is launched to stand on its own after 18 months. eFounders retains a portion of the business. 

Initially, eFounders specialized in Software as a Service (SaaS) products, but during 2020, co-founder Elziere shared that the company would expand its projects. The company invests an average of 600,000 euros per project, and has fundraised more than 130 million euros for its startups.

Startups

References

External links 

 

Business incubators of France
French companies established in 2011
Belgian companies established in 2011